A list of people, who died during the 2nd century, who have received recognition as Saints (through canonization) from the Catholic Church:

See also 

Christianity in the 2nd century
Apostolic Fathers
List of Church Fathers

02
 
Saints